The General Confederation of Workers of Panama (CGTP) is a national trade union center in Panama. It is affiliated with the International Trade Union Confederation.

References

Trade unions in Panama
International Trade Union Confederation